Gwendolyn S. King (born August 23, 1940, in East Orange, New Jersey) is an American businesswoman. From 1989 to 1992 she was the Commissioner of the U.S. Social Security Administration.

Early life
King attended Howard University as an undergraduate, earning a Bachelor of Arts degree in French and education in 1962. She later attended the George Washington University, where she earned a master's degree in public administration in 1974.

Career 
King began her career teaching in Niagara Falls, New York and Washington, DC.

Beginning in 1971, she worked for the Department of Health and Human Services (then called the Department of Health, Education and Welfare).

From 1978 to 1979, she served as senior legislative assistant to Senator John Heinz. 

In 1986, she was appointed Deputy Assistant to President Ronald Reagan and Director of the office for Intergovernmental Affairs. 

In 1989, President George H.W. Bush appointed King as Commissioner of the Social Security Administration. King became the 11th Commissioner and the first black woman to hold the position. She served through 1992.

King is now a member of the board of directors of Lockheed-Martin Corporation and Monsanto Company. She is also formerly a director of Pharmacia.  She is also a director of the National Association of Corporate Directors.

Awards
King has been awarded honorary doctorates from the University of New Haven and the University of Maryland-Baltimore County.

Personal life
King is married to Colbert I. King, Washington Post columnist and the editorial page's deputy editor. The two met at Howard in the late 1950s and married in 1961. They have three children, including Rob King, senior vice president of SportsCenter and News at ESPN.

References

External links

1940 births
American businesspeople
Commissioners of the Social Security Administration
Trachtenberg School of Public Policy & Public Administration alumni
Living people
People from East Orange, New Jersey
Howard University alumni
Reagan administration personnel
George H. W. Bush administration personnel